Alain Fossoul (31 December 1928 – 9 May 2012) was a Belgian footballer who played as a defender.

Career
Fossoul played for Anderlecht, Boom and Jette. While with Anderlecht, Fossoul won the Belgian Pro League five times and the Belgian Cup once.

References

1928 births
2012 deaths
Belgian footballers
Association football defenders
R.S.C. Anderlecht players